Code for America is a 501(c)(3) non-profit organization founded in 2009 with the aim of bridging the gap between the public and private sectors in their use of technology and design. The organization's mission is to enhance government services, with a particular focus on those in need.. The organization's non-partisan and non-political nature ensures that its activities are focused solely on improving the effectiveness of government services.

The motto of the organization is:

In a TED talk in May 2022, the organization's CEO Amanda Renteria said:
 Renteria has seen that the millions of people who rely on government welfare services are often discouraged from seeking them out, frustrated by long lines and unnecessarily complicated processes. Therefore, she is helping develop human-centered technology that "respects you from the start, meets you where you are and provides an easy, positive experience." She details the four factors that hinder effective delivery of government benefits and explains Code for America's plan to bring user-centric, digital-first social services to more than 13 million Americans and unlock 30 billion dollars in benefits for low-income families.

A large population of American citizens in poverty are not connected and exposed to these government resources that they are eligible for—almost $60,000,000,000 worth of potential benefits for these people in need remain unclaimed every year, while Code for America has raised nearly $16,000,000.  Additionally, just 1 in 6 homes report a lack of sufficient food for children. The organization began by enlisting technology and design professionals to work with city governments in the United States in order to build open-source applications and promote openness, participation, and efficiency in government, and now works with state, county, and federal government to spread the principles and practices of "delivery-driven government." It has grown into a cross-sector network of public sector change agents and a platform for "civic hacking".

The Code for America Brigade Network includes 80+ brigades across the country committed to volunteering in their local communities. Code for America also runs a Community Fellowship where brigade members work within local government to help improve digital services. Today, Code for America has 3 branches of program areas: health, criminal justice, and workforce development.

Founding and history

In 2009, the founder Jennifer Pahlka was working with O'Reilly Media at the Gov 2.0 Summit in Washington, DC. A conversation with Andrew Greenhill, the Mayor's Chief of Staff of the City of Tucson, sparked the initial idea for Code for America, when he said "You need to pay attention to the local level, because cities are in major crisis. Revenues are down, costs are up—if we don't change how cities work, they're going to fail." The two began discussing plans for a program that eventually became Code for America, "a one-year fellowship recruiting developers to work for city government". With support from web entrepreneur Leonard Lin, Tim O'Reilly of O'Reilly Media, and technologist Clay A. Johnson, among others, the organization was launched in September 2009.

The Washington Post described Code for America as "the technology world's equivalent of the Peace Corps or Teach for America". The article goes on to say, "They bring fresh blood to the solution process, deliver agile coding and software development skills, and frequently offer new perspectives on the latest technology—something that is often sorely lacking from municipal government IT programs. This is a win-win for cities that need help and for technologists that want to give back and contribute to lower government costs and the delivery of improved government service."

The New York Times described Code for America as "a new nonprofit project... which aims to import the efficiency of the Web into government infrastructures" and "[tries] to make working in government fun and creative".

Code for America launched the international civic technology organization, Code for All, in 2012. By 2017, Code for Canada, which is modeled somewhat on Code for America, was established.

In 2018, in partnership with George Gascón, District Attorney for San Francisco, Code for America's Clear My Record software was applied to automate searching for cannabis-related criminal records eligible to be expunged after California voters passed Proposition 64, the Adult Use of Marijuana Act, in 2016. On April 3, 2019, Judge Samuel K. Feng signed off expunging more than 8,000 convictions using the software; officials in Los Angeles and in San Joaquin County have announced that they will use the software for the same purpose in 2019.

Leadership 
Besides the Chief Executive Officer and Founder, there are several members in the Code for America Leadership Team.

 Chief Communications and Marketing Officer: Arlene Corbin Lewis
 Director of Client Success: Elena Fortuna
 Chief Revenue Officer: Emily Tracy
 Chief of People, Equity, and Operations: Leslie Campbell
 Chief Technology Officer: Lou Moore
 Chief of Staff: Ryan Ko
  Deputy Chief of Staff: Yasmin Fodil

Events

Fellowship Program and its projects 
From 2011 to 2016, Code for America connected city governments and web professionals through the Code for America Fellowship program.

The first year of the fellowship program began in January 2011. Twenty fellows were selected from 360 applicants, resulting in a 5.6% acceptance rate. Boston, Philadelphia, Washington, DC, and Seattle were the four cities selected to participate in the 2011 program.

On January 4, 2012, Code for America began its second year fellowship program with 26 fellows and eight cities: Austin, Chicago, Detroit, Honolulu, Macon, New Orleans, Philadelphia, and Santa Cruz. The 2016 Code for America fellowship program ran in partnership with six cities: Kansas City, Missouri; Long Beach, California; New Orleans, Louisiana; New York City, New York; Salt Lake County, Utah; and Seattle, Washington.

Each city partnered with a team of five web programmers or designers selected for the fellowship. Over a period of 11 months, the fellows and city government collaborated to develop a web application to solve a civic problem identified by the city in their project proposals. The completed software applications are released as open-source for any city government to use or adapt.

The inaugural 2011 fellowship program launched four projects in Boston, Seattle, Philadelphia, and Washington, DC. Each city partnered with a team of three web programmers or designers selected for the fellowship. Over a period of 11 months, the fellows and city government collaborated to develop a web application to solve a civic problem identified by the city in their project proposals. The completed civic applications were released as open-source for any city government to use or adapt.

In 2011, CFA coders developed an "Adopt a Hydrant" website, so that volunteers in Boston could sign up to shovel out fire hydrants after storms. The system has now been implemented in Providence, Rhode Island, Anchorage, Alaska, and Chicago. Honolulu created a similar website, "Adopt-A-Siren", for its tsunami sirens.

In 2012, fellows at Code for America created Honolulu Answers, a web application that provides simple, to-the-point answers to citizens' questions. The web application was populated with citizen input at a write-a-thon, which became a unique model for civic engagement. Both Honolulu Answers and the write-a-thon model have since been redeployed in a dozen cities around the world, including as Oakland Answers and Durban Answers.

In 2015, fellows at Code for America designed GetCalFresh.org, to streamline the CalFresh application process. In California, 40% of people who are eligible for CalFresh, the state's Supplemental Nutrition Assistance Program, were not receiving benefits. California has the second lowest participation rate in the country. Although an online application is available in California, it can take up to an hour to complete, is more than 50 web pages long with more than 100 questions. It also doesn't work on mobile devices, despite the fact that most low-income people rely on smartphones for access to the Internet. GetCalFresh takes an average time of 11 minutes to complete and, as of 2016, was being used by 9 counties to help over 1,000 people. In addition, it leverages mobile phone access among applicants to encourage questions and answers, all over text. Current efforts are focused on scaling this solution.

In 2018, Code for America launched a new Community Fellowship program in which members of its volunteer Brigade network pair with government in their local communities to help improve services for vulnerable populations over the course of 6 months. The first Community Fellowships were in Austin, Asheville, Honolulu, and San Jose.

In April 2018, The Audacious Project, a collaborative funding with several philanthropic organizations across the nation. The project was funded by TED along with the help of groups such as the Skoll Foundation, Virgin Unite, The Valhalla Charitable Foundation, ELMA Philanthropies, the Science Philanthropy Alliance, and many more. The primary goal of this endeavor was to improve America's social safety net and help citizens bear the benefits of government services. Their goal was to unlock a grand total of $30,000,000,000 worth of benefits. Code for America was 1 of 10 recipients of the funding among other nonprofit organizations in the United States

Successful Remote and Distributed Work in Uncertain Times 
Just days after the world shut down and logged online because of COVID-19, Code for America held a virtual event to educate citizens on how to safely interact with the government and stay proactive and successful during the pandemic.

Code for America hosted guest speakers and volunteers from organizations such as:

 18F
 U.S. Digital Service
 Nava Public Benefit Corporation
 Truss

Meetings consisted of ways to

 Hold meetings productively online
 How to collaborate with other groups
 Receive advice for managers, managing vendors
 Stay mentally and physically healthy

The virtual event was recorded and is accessible on https://codeforamerica.org/events/successful-remote-and-distributed-work-in-uncertain-times/

Reimagining 911 (9th Annual National Day of Civic Hacking) 
 Code for America states that as the 911 government emergency response line is one of the most interactive between citizens and the U.S. government, it is essential that the response team sends appropriate help, as they state that a response team is never 'one-size-fits-all.' The goal of Code for America's event, in collaboration with Transform 911, was to garner thousands of volunteers to evaluate years of data from the 911 emergency response team to create various types of projects to reach their goal of making emergency response 'truly human-centered.' 
 At this event in September 2021, Code for America began by holding a panel of board members of Tucson Police, Transform 911, and Code for America to discuss the importance and accessibility of the nationwide emergency response hotline, and how it strives to be completely 'human-centered.' Then, over 1,000 volunteers and committee leaders split into groups to conduct several case studies, data analysis, and prototype projects.

Code for America Summit 2022 
 Code for America Summit 2022 was an in-person and online event with a theme of 'building the path forward together.' Their 4 pillars of change were:
 Service Design + Delivery  Policy + Administration  Operations + Management  People Power + Community
 That is, Code For America strives for change and improvement in government systems with these annual summit events. As Code for America recognizes the plans for change to be more equitable and efficient laid out by the government, the yearly summit seeks to make these plans a reality. Through guest speakers, breakout and networking sessions, keynotes during this two-day conference, Code for America was able to network changemakers from all around the world.

Partnerships

Big Companies, Corporations, and People 
Code for America operates with financial support from a set of corporate sponsors and individual donors. Among these are foundations led by information technology leaders such as the Bill & Melinda Gates Foundation and Chan Zuckerberg Initiative, respectively formed by Microsoft co-founder Bill Gates and Facebook co-founder Mark Zuckerberg. Further primary supporters include the Ford Foundation, Kaiser Permanente, Knight Foundation, Luminate, Robert Wood Johnson Foundation, Share Our Strength, Skoll Foundation, Rockefeller Foundation, United Way Bay Area, and the Walmart Foundation.

State Partnerships 
Code for America and the city of Austin, Texas joined forces in 2012 to tackle common city problems. 
15 states have claimed and planned to partner with Code for America in hopes of fulfilling their goals. In May 2022, Code for America announced their first collaboration with 4 states (California, Colorado, Connecticut, Louisiana) through the "Safety Net Innovation Lab." This first cohort of states was funded over $100,000,000 by The Audacious Project and Blue Meridian Partners. These investments are in efforts to create public benefits more accessible to all and provide a "social safety net" for every and all Americans. Their goal was to unlock $30,000,000,000 worth of benefits for citizens.  Each state had its own baseline / theme for improvement:

 California:
 In collaboration with the California Department of Social Services, Code for America promotes the 'SNAP' outreach method for public benefits, aimed specifically at those without knowledge and/or literal access to them.
 Colorado:
 In collaboration with the state of Colorado, Code for America seeks to simplify online applications and ways that citizens can access basic needs such as childcare, healthcare, food, and cash assistance.
 For example, after research, it was concluded that the main source for information for housing for Colorado residents is the website HousingBoulder.net. As the website was presented as overwhelming and intimidating for a majority of users, Code for America worked to revamp the page to make it far more straightforward and engaging for citizens to use and seek public benefits that they may have missed out on.
 Connecticut:
 In collaboration with the Connecticut Department of Social Services, Code for America networks out to these citizens who can not access public benefits and gathers feedback on what they are experiencing. Then, the two will re-evaluate and improve ways to hear from Connecticut residents. For this partnership, the main area of improvement is food assistance.
 Louisiana:
 In collaboration with the Louisiana Department of Children and Family Services, Code for America plans to improve promotion of 'SNAP' outreach for citizens. Similar to Colorado, they will seek to simplify application processes. And similar to Connecticut, the main area of improvement is food assistance.

Other work

MNbenefits 
MNbenefits is a specific initiative branch of Code for America that to help citizens specifically of the state of Minnesota. Throughout the duration of MNbenefits, Code for America, in partnership with the Minnesota government, has achieved an 80% reduction in the time taken to apply for the governmental benefits in Minnesota, processing a total of 25,000 applications. Users report that it took them a mere 12 minutes to complete an application versus an hour prior to the renovation. Their main 'safety net benefits' were food assistance, cash programs  (Diversionary Work Program, General Assistance, MN Family Investment Program, MN Supplemental Aid, Refugee Cash Assistance) emergency assistance, housing support, and child care.

GetCalFresh 
GetCalFresh is another specific initiative branch of Code for America that unlocks benefits for California citizens in every single county in California. It is the bridge between these underrepresented citizens and the governmental program CalFresh, California's version of the Supplemental Nutrition Assistance Program (SNAP). The main purpose of GetCalFresh is for California citizens to receive monthly benefits and funding to help people buy food. As of the year 2019, GetCalFresh was able to help more than 6,000,000 receive the benefits they were missing out on. From January to February 2022, the GetCalFresh team scored a 76% on the CSAT(Customer Satisfaction Score)

getCTC.org 
getCTC.org is an online tool to help taxpayers reap the benefits of their tax credits. It was originally announced in 2021 to simplify tax-filing for low to middle-income workers in order to claim their tax credits they have been missing out on. According to the 2018 Treasury Inspector General for Tax Administration, 22% of taxpayers did not claim their earned income tax credit, totaling up to $7,000,000,000 worth of unclaimed benefits. During a 10-week trial of this tool in 2021 a total 115,451 households were able to claim $440,000,000 worth in their now claimed benefits. As this is an ongoing program, Code for America seeks to help even more citizens get they benefits they deserve.

Active brigades

See Related Articles 
Civic technology Companies

Civic technology

References

External links
Code for America official website
Changing Government and Tech with Geeks, Nick Bilton, The New York Times, July 6, 2010
How an Army of Techies Is Taking on City Hall, Anya Kamenetz, Fast Company, November 29, 2010
Remaking Government in a Wiki Age, Chrystia Freeland/Reuters, The New York Times, August 18, 2011

Foundations based in the United States
Transparency (behavior)
Politics and technology
Open government
Non-profit organizations based in San Francisco
Open government in the United States
Charities based in California